David Ole Nkedianye (born 20 December 1963) is a Kenyan politician who served as the 1st governor of Kajiado County. Nkedianye won the Kajiado county 2013 gubernatorial elections closely defeating Parantai Moses of the Democratic Party (Kenya)

In 2017, while defending his gubernatorial seat in an ODM ticket, Ole Nkedianye lost the elections to Jubilee party's Joseph Jama Ole Lenku.

Ole Nkedianye has previously served as a community facilitator for International Livestock Research Institute helping in the provision of breeding bulls for farmers in pastoral regions in Kajiado, Kenya

Born in Kitengela, Kajiado County. Nkedianye is a graduate of the University of Nairobi and holds a PhD in Pastoralism land-use and conservation from the University of Edinburgh. Nkedianye also hold a Bachelor of Education in Social education and ethics from the Catholic University of East Africa.

References

1963 births
Living people
County Governors of Kenya
University of Nairobi alumni
Alumni of the University of Edinburgh
People from Kajiado County